Bimini Island Air, Inc./Ltd. was a part 135 shared charter operator with its headquarters in unincorporated Broward County, Florida, near Fort Lauderdale. Operating out of Fort Lauderdale, Bimini Island Air flew to various islands in the Bahamas including Bimini, Marsh Harbour, Treasure Cay and Freeport. Bimini Island Air focus cities were Bimini and Marsh Harbour. Its FAA operating certificate was revoked by the FAA in 2011.

The former Bimini Island Air facility is now occupied by Creston Aviation.

Destinations 
Bahamas
Bimini
Marsh Harbour
Treasure Cay
North Eleuthera
Freeport
Nassau
San Salvador

Florida
Key West
Ft. Lauderdale International
Ft. Lauderdale Executive
Miami
Orlando

Fleet 
The Bimini Island Air fleet consisted of a single aircraft on April 7, 2011. As of September 22, 2011 it had been repossessed by the leasing company.

See also 
 List of defunct airlines of the United States

References

External links 
 https://web.archive.org/web/20160418090503/https://www.youtube.com/watch?v=WVSkaObJTcE
 "FAA Revokes Bimini Island Air Operating Certificate", Federal Aviation Administration press release, July 11, 2011.

Defunct airlines of the United States
Bimini